Bruno Monsaingeon (born 5 December 1943) is a French filmmaker, writer, and violinist. He has made a number of documentary films about famous twentieth-century musicians, including Glenn Gould, Sviatoslav Richter, David Oistrakh, Piotr Anderszewski, Yehudi Menuhin, Francesco Libetta, Grigory Sokolov, Maurizio Pollini and David Fray. His interviews with Richter and with Nadia Boulanger have also been published as books.

Notes

External links
 brunomonsaingeon.com, official website
 

1943 births
Living people
French film directors
French male screenwriters
French screenwriters
20th-century French male violinists
21st-century French male violinists